Tony Miller may refer to:

Sportspeople
Tony Miller (basketball) (born 1973), American basketball coach and former player
Tony Miller (rugby league), rugby league footballer of the 1960s and 1970s for Castleford 
Tony Miller (rugby union) (1929–1988), Australian rugby union player
Tony Miller (footballer) (born 1937), retired English footballer

Others
Tony Miller (California politician) (born 1948), Secretary of State of California
Tony Miller (government official) (born 1950), Hong Kong government official and collector of Chinese porcelain 
Tony Miller (cinematographer) (born 1964), English cinematographer and documentary filmmaker

See also
Anthony Miller (disambiguation)